TKO Major League MMA is a Canadian mixed martial arts promotion established in 2000, it was originally broadcast on RDS and later on Fight Network. Formerly known as the Universal Combat Challenge (UCC), it was the first mixed martial arts promotion in Canada, before eventually rebranding to TKO Major League MMA in 2003. For years it was the largest MMA promotion in Canada, before eventually going on hiatus for 8 years. Returning in 2016, since then it has signed a deal with the UFC to be broadcast on the promotion's streaming service UFC Fightpass.

History
Founded in early 2000 by Stephane Patry and Universal Combat Challenge (UCC) would allow wrestling, boxing, kickboxing, grappling, their bouts consisted of two 10 minute rounds. The rules at the beginning also allowed for knee's and kick's(soccer kick) to the head of a downed opponent. Following the success of the first event they would announce that the promotion would 
be instituting Canadian Championship titles as well as the World Championship titles beginning at UCC 2 due to international interest, this would last until 2005 when the promotion unified the titles. UFC/TKO started off with 6 weight classes, 265 lb, formerly unlimited), Light Heavyweight (205 lb), Middleweight(185 lb), Welterweight(170 lb), Lightweight(155 lb) and Super Lightweight(now known as Featherweight 145 lb). Bantamweight would be added in 2007 and following the promotions return from hiatus, Flyweight(125 lb) and 2 female weight classes were introduced, Woman's Flyweight and Woman's Straw-weight (125 lb and 115 lb).

TKO/UCC was the first promotion of its kind in Canada and was host to an abundance of Canada's top MMA talent for close to two decades, in 2003 the organization would be rebranded as TKO Major League MMA. In the promotions early days they used a boxing-style ring for their contests, before eventually being one of the first to adopt the UFC-spec octagon. The promotion has organized 62 events involving over 620 matches.

Universal Combat Challenge
On June 2, 2000, UCC would hold their first event in Montreal, Quebec, Canada. The promotion ran 21 events under the UCC banner before rebranding to TKO Major League MMA in 2003.

Events

TKO Major League MMA

On September 6, 2003, TKO had its first show under the new brand name. 41 events have been held under the TKO banner with the previous UCC events being added being added onto TKO.

Events

Events

Scheduled events

Past events

Return
The company's return to action would be announced with TKO 36: Resurrection on November 4, 2016. This coming after 8 years of inactivity. With founder Stephane Patry returning it quickly regained its status as one of the top Mixed Martial Arts promotions in Canada. Since then it has held 14 event's all in Quebec, the return would see the introduction of new weight classes including female weight classes which had previously been absent from the promotion.

Broadcast deal
In August 2016 it was announced that TKO Major League and the Ultimate Fighting Championship had signed a deal for TKO events to be broadcast on the UFC's digital streaming service, UFC Fight Pass. TKO MMA had its first event on Fightpass on November 4, 2016. The promotion also acts as a feeder organization for the UFC with the company often offering contracts to TKO Major League Champions. The prelims still air on Fight Network.

Current issues
In 2019, TKO Major League had to cancel TKO Major League 46: Pessoa vs. Gane due to 18 fighter's being injured or ill well trying to book the card. The Second incident occurred when President of the organization Stephane Patry was hospitalized, the promotion had to cancel its second event of the year TKO Major League 49: Matsuba vs. Gordan postponing it. The Covid-19 pandemic would force the organization to remain inactive from 2020 to 2021, as the company decided to restructure before returning to action. Athletes under contract with TKO have all obtained permission to fight outside of organization during this time, athletes with valid contracts have not left TKO.

Champions

TKO World Heavyweight Championship
120 kg (265 lb)

TKO Canadian Heavyweight Championship
120 kg (265 lb)

TKO World Light Heavyweight Championship
93 kg (205 lb)

TKO Canadian Light Heavyweight Championship
93 kg (205 lb)

TKO World Middleweight Championship
84 kg (185 lb)

TKO Canadian Middleweight Championship
84 kg (185 lb)

TKO World Welterweight Championship
77 kg (170 lb)

TKO Canadian Welterweight Championship
77 kg (170 lb)

TKO World Lightweight Championship
70 kg (155 lb)

TKO Canadian Lightweight Championship
70 kg (155 lb)

TKO World Super Lightweight Championship
70 kg (145 lb)

TKO Canadian Super Lightweight Championship
70 kg (145 lb)

TKO World Featherweight Championship
70 kg (145 lb)

TKO World Bantamweight Championship
61 kg (135 lb)

TKO World Flyweight Championship
57 kg (125 lb)

TKO World Women's Flyweight Championship
57 kg (125 lb)

TKO Women's Strawweight Championship
52 kg (115 lb)

Notable alumni
Georges St-Pierre
Jonathan Goulet
Jeremy Horn
Duane Ludwig
Sean Pierson
Elvis Sinosic
Dave Beneteau
Rich Franklin
Ivan Menjivar
Urijah Faber
David Loiseau
Baret Yoshida
Justin Bruckmann
Wagnney Fabiano
Steve Vigneault
Jens Pulver
Sean Sherk
Hatsu Hioki
John Alessio
Joe Doerksen
Shonie Carter
Patrick CôteJason Black
Jeff Curran
Mark HominickSam StoutChris HorodeckiTony Fryklund
Chris ClementsSteve BosséKrzysztof SoszynskiCiryl GaneJesse RonsonCharles JourdainMarc-André BarriaultNate ManessTaylor Lapilus Malcolm Gordon

References

External links
 
 Major League MMA at Sherdog

 
Mixed martial arts organizations
Sports organizations established in 2000
Mixed martial arts events lists